Bloomsbury Classics are a series of small-format hardback novels published by Bloomsbury Publishing in the UK, not to be confused with a similarly named series of paperbacks published in the US.

Included in this series:

Across the Bridge by Mavis Gallant
Angel, All Innocence and Other Stories by Fay Weldon
At The Jerusalem by Paul Bailey
Bad Girls by Mary Flanagan
The Birds of the Air by Alice Thomas Ellis
Bliss and Other Stories by Katherine Mansfield
Bright Lights, Big City by Jay McInerney
Carol by Patricia Highsmith
The Choir by Joanna Trollope
Christmas Stories selected by Giles GordonCocktails at Doney's by William TrevorComing Through Slaughter by Michael OndaatjeThe Country Girls by Edna O'BrienThe Double Bass by Patrick SuskindEmperor of the Air by Ethan CaninThe English Patient by Michael OndaatjeFlaubert's Parrot by Julian BarnesGhost Stories selected by Giles GordonThe Great Gatsby by F. Scott FitzgeraldGreen Water, Green Sky by Mavis GallantThe Heather Blazing by Colm ToibinIn Pharaoh's Army by Tobias WolffJimmy and the Desperate Woman by D. H. LawrenceKeepers of the House by Lisa St Aubin de TeránThe Lagoon and Other Stories by Janet FrameA Little Stranger by Candia McWilliamLives of Girls and Women by Alice MunroThe Lonely Passion of Judith Hearne by Brian MooreThe Lover by Marguerite DurasOld Soldiers by Paul BaileyOranges Are Not the Only Fruit by Jeanette Winterson Orlando by Virginia WoolfOwls Do Cry by Janet FrameThe Passion by Jeanette WintersonThe Passion of New Eve by Angela CarterPerfume by Patrick SuskindThe Pigeon by Patrick SuskindThe Pumpkin Eater by Penelope MortimerThe Quantity Theory of Insanity by Will SelfA Room of One's Own by Virginia WoolfRunning in the Family by Michael OndaatjeSetting Free the Bears by John IrvingSexing the Cherry by Jeanette WintersonThe Snow Queen by Hans Christian AndersenStory of My Life by Jay McInerneySurfacing by Margaret AtwoodThis Boy's Life by Tobias WolffTwelve Dancing Princesses by The Brothers GrimmA Village Affair by Joanna TrollopeWide Sargasso Sea by Jean RhysWilderness Tips'' by Margaret Atwood

References

External links
Images

Lists of novels